Mutukuda Arachchige Jayasinghe Wijesinghe, (1 August 1920 - 19??) was a Sri Lankan politician. He was a member of Parliament of Sri Lanka from Wariyapola representing the Sri Lanka Freedom Party. 

He first contested from Wariyapola in the 1962 by-election following the death of A. M. Adikari and was elected parliament. He lost his seat in the 1965 general election to D. M. Tilakaratna Bandara. He  was re-elected in the 1970 general election, but lost the 1977 general election.

References

1920 births

Members of the 5th Parliament of Ceylon
Members of the 7th Parliament of Ceylon
Sri Lanka Freedom Party politicians